Washington County is a county in the U.S. state of Nebraska. As of the 2010 United States Census, the population was 20,234. Its county seat is Blair.

Washington County is part of the Omaha-Council Bluffs, NE-IA Metropolitan Statistical Area.

In the Nebraska license plate system, Washington County is represented by the prefix 29 (it had the 29th-largest number of vehicles registered in the county when the license plate system was established in 1922).

History
Washington County is in eastern Nebraska on the Missouri River. It was explored by Europeans as early as 1739 by Pierre Antoine and Paul Mallet, who were on a trapping expedition to Canada. In 1804, Lewis and Clark reported the establishment of the new United States government to a council of Indian chiefs near the present site of Fort Calhoun. As a result of this Council, Fort Atkinson was established in 1819 and served as a key midwestern outpost until 1827.

The first permanent settlement in Washington County was in 1854. In that same year, the county was organized as one of the eight original counties proclaimed by acting Governor Thomas B. Cuming; it was reorganized in 1855. The county seat has been in three different towns: Fort Calhoun, DeSoto, and Blair, its present site since 1869.

The Fort Calhoun Nuclear Generating Station south of Blair, which was North America's smallest commercial nuclear reactor by rated capacity, was closed in October 2016 to begin decommissioning. An associated system of warning sirens was located in the southeastern part of the county for emergency notification in the event of a problem at the station.

An Atlas missile launch site (Site B), formerly associated with Offutt Air Force Base and deactivated in the 1960s, lies east of Arlington.

Geography
Washington County lies on the east side of Nebraska. Its east boundary line abuts the west boundary line of the state of Iowa, across the Missouri River. The Elkhorn River flows southeastward along the county's southwest border, and a smaller drainage, the Little Papillon River, flows southward through the center part of the county, discharging into Glenn Cunningham Reservoir south of the county. The county's terrain consists of low rolling hills sloping to the east, with several drainage channels eroded into its eastern portion sloping down to the river. The county's planar areas are largely devoted to agriculture. It is Nebraska's fifth-smallest county by area.

Adjacent counties

 Burt County - north
 Harrison County, Iowa - northeast
 Pottawattamie County, Iowa - southeast
 Douglas County - south
 Dodge County - west

Protected areas

 Boyer Chute National Wildlife Refuge
 DeSoto National Wildlife Refuge (part)
 Fort Atkinson State Historical Park
 Neale Woods Nature Center (partial)

Demographics

As of the 2010 United States Census, there were 20,234 people and 8,022 households in the county. The racial makeup of the county was 97.1% White, 0.8% Black or African American, 0.4% Native American, 0.4% Asian, 0.1% Pacific Islander, 1.2% from two or more races. 3.1% of the population were Hispanic or Latino of any race. 94.4% of the county was Non-Hispanic White.

As of the 2000 United States Census, there were 18,780 people, 6,940 households, and 5,149 families in the county. The population density was 48 people per square mile (19/km2). There were 7,408 housing units at an average density of 19 per square mile (7/km2). The racial makeup of the county was 98.12% White, 0.34% Black or African American, 0.20% Native American, 0.29% Asian, 0.11% Pacific Islander, 0.30% from other races, and 0.63% from two or more races. 1.08% of the population were Hispanic or Latino of any race. 37.1% were of German, 11.9% Danish, 9.0% Irish, 7.8% American and 7.0% English ancestry.

There were 6,940 households, out of which 36.40% had children under the age of 18 living with them, 64.00% were married couples living together, 7.00% had a female householder with no husband present, and 25.80% were non-families. 21.80% of all households were made up of individuals, and 10.10% had someone living alone who was 65 years of age or older. The average household size was 2.63 and the average family size was 3.09.

The county population contained 27.10% under the age of 18, 9.30% from 18 to 24, 26.70% from 25 to 44, 24.10% from 45 to 64, and 12.90% who were 65 years of age or older. The median age was 37 years. For every 100 females there were 98.70 males. For every 100 females age 18 and over, there were 96.20 males.

The median income for a household in the county was $48,500, and the median income for a family was $56,429. Males had a median income of $36,901 versus $25,893 for females. The per capita income for the county was $21,055. About 4.10% of families and 6.00% of the population were below the poverty line, including 8.00% of those under age 18 and 7.50% of those age 65 or over.

Transportation

Major highways

  U.S. Highway 30
  U.S. Highway 75
  Nebraska Highway 31
  Nebraska Highway 91
  Nebraska Highway 133

Airports
Washington County contains Blair Municipal Airport, and several small privately owned grass airstrips, such as the Orum Aerodrome.  There is also a helipad at the Memorial Community Hospital in Blair.

Communities

Cities
 Blair (county seat)
 Fort Calhoun

Villages

 Arlington
 Herman
 Kennard
 Washington

Census-designated place
 Fontanelle

Unincorporated communities

 De Soto
 Nashville
 Orum
 Spiker
 Telbasta

Townships

 Fort Calhoun
 Richland
 Herman
 Township 6
 Arlington

Politics
Washington County voters are reliably Republican. In only one national election since 1936 has the county selected the Democratic Party candidate (as of 2020).

See also
 Washington County Historical Association
 National Register of Historic Places listings in Washington County, Nebraska

References

 
Nebraska counties on the Missouri River
1855 establishments in Nebraska Territory
Populated places established in 1855